Brigadier Dame Mary Mackenzie Pihl ( Anderson; 3 February 1916 – 18 June 2006) was a British Army officer. She served with the Women's Auxiliary Territorial Service, the forerunner of the Women's Royal Army Corps during World War II. By 1946, she was ATS Group Commander Highland District based in Perth and, discovering she enjoyed service life, decided to make it her career.

Anderson was the younger child and only daughter of Sir John Anderson, later the 1st Viscount Waverley, who was Home Secretary and Minister for Home Security at the outbreak of WWII, and his wife, Christina ( Mackenzie). 

Educated at Sutton High School and the Villa Brillantmont in Lausanne, she joined the ATS in 1941 and was commissioned the following year. On leaving Perth in 1946, she undertook her first speciality work within the WRAC as assistant provost marshal (WRAC) responsible for WRAC disciplinary matters for the British Army of the Rhine and in the UK.

Marriage
She married Frithjof Pihl on 8 July 1973. He died in 1988.

References 

1916 births
2006 deaths
Auxiliary Territorial Service officers
Place of birth missing
Place of death missing
Daughters of viscounts
British Army brigadiers
Dames Commander of the Order of the British Empire